Cuando los hijos se van ("When Children Leave") is a 1941 Mexican film. It stars Sara García and Fernando Soler as the protagonists and features Miguel Inclán as an especially odious villain. A later version, directed by Julián Soler was released in 1969 and also starred Fernando Soler.

External links
 

1941 films
1940s Spanish-language films
Films directed by Juan Bustillo Oro
Mexican black-and-white films
Mexican drama films
1941 drama films
1940s Mexican films